Dongola, also spelled Dunqulah, is the capital of the state of Northern Sudan, on the banks of the Nile, and a former Latin Catholic bishopric (14th century). It should not be confused with Old Dongola, an ancient city located 80 km upstream on the opposite bank.

Etymology 
The word Dongola comes from the Nubian word "Doñqal" which means red brick, as most buildings were made of bricks, thus provoking one of ancient Nubia's biggest industries. A more modern use of the word is to describe a strong and hard bulwark, that being so Dongola is often called "the Resident of a large Nile castle".

History 
Dongola was a province of Upper Nubia on both sides of the Nile, and the city was a centre for Nubian civilization, as manifested by its many archaeological remains from the Makurian and Islamic periods. Dongolawis originate from early indigenous Nubian Sub Saharan African inhabitants with many taking pride in their mostly non-mixed ancestry; although always faced with criticism this helped preserve the Nilo Saharan Dongolawi Nubian language (sometimes pejoratively referred to as Rotana); however, cultural preferences are slowly changing. The remains of the revered Baqt Treaty are to be found in Dongola. The province of Dongola was part of the Makuria kingdom, which later became part of Egypt after Muhammad Ali Pasha ordered the invasion and occupation of Sudan in 1820; after which it was designated as a seat of a pasha. Its first governor was Abidin Bey.

Dongola was the scene of a victory by General Herbert Kitchener over the indigenous Mahdist Muslim tribes in 1896 who later turned it into a British-Egyptian army base with the objective of collecting and storing weapons, gear and resources. Dongola was a considered an all time base for sending campaign reports to Britain, and the first English press release was issued in the name of Dongola Star, with news of the British-Egyptian army in Sudan. Kitchener's forces were known for their mercilessness, killing over 15,000 Mahdist troops in the Battle of Omdurman in 1898, and later on proceeded to kill the wounded, raising the overall death toll to over 50,000.

Dongola Road and Dongola Avenue in the Bishopston area of Bristol were named after this event; as was Dongola Road in Tottenham, North London which runs next to Kitchener Road. There is also a Dongola Road in Jersey (Channel Islands). There is a Dongola Road, in Plaistow, East London. In the United States, Dongola, Illinois was established in the 1850s, and named for Dongola. There is also a Dongola Lane in Shakopee, Minnesota, and a Dongola Hwy. in Conway, South Carolina.

Ecclesiastical history 

The Latin Catholic Diocese of Dongola was established in 1330 and suppressed in 1350. No incumbent is recorded.

Dongola racing 
The Nile Expedition of 1884–1885 to relieve Gordon at Khartoum passed through the area. Regiments were challenged to race up the river by boat, and this gave rise to the English regatta competition of dongola racing.

Climate 
Dongola has a hot desert climate (Köppen climate classification BWh) as it is located in the Sahara Desert, one of the hottest, sunniest and driest regions in the world.

Dongola receives only  of precipitation annually because of its arid location. September is the wettest month, receiving  of rain on average. Rainfall is sporadic but more likely to occur in the summer. Six months receive no precipitation at all. Humidity is low year-round, but it is higher in winter. Dongola receives 3813.8 hours of sunshine annually, which is 87% of all possible sunshine. June has the most sunshine and September has the least.

References

External links 

 The Shaikiya. An account of the Shaikiya tribes and of the history of Dongola Province from the XIVth to the XIXth century (1913)
 "Dongola, Sudan: Climate, Global Warming, and Daylight Charts and Data" . Climatecharts.com. Accessed September 2010.
 GCatholic 

Populated places in Northern (state)
State capitals in Sudan